Alhambra is a municipality in Ciudad Real, Castile-La Mancha, Spain. It has a population of 1,213. Sierra de Alhambra is a mountain range close to the town.

Municipalities in the Province of Ciudad Real